In optimal control, problems of singular control are problems that are difficult to solve because a straightforward application of Pontryagin's minimum principle fails to yield a complete solution.  Only a few such problems have been solved, such as Merton's portfolio problem in financial economics or trajectory optimization in aeronautics. A more technical explanation follows.

The most common difficulty in applying Pontryagin's principle arises when the Hamiltonian depends linearly on the control , i.e., is of the form:  and the control is restricted to being between an upper and a lower bound: .

 

The case when  remains at zero for a finite length of time  is called the singular control case. Between  and  the maximization of the Hamiltonian with respect to  gives us no useful information and the solution in that time interval is going to have to be found from other considerations. (One approach would be to repeatedly differentiate  with respect to time until the control u again explicitly appears, though this is not guaranteed to happen eventually. One can then set that expression to zero and solve for u. The resulting so-called singular arc, if it is optimal, will satisfy the Kelley condition:

Others refer to this condition as the generalized Legendre–Clebsch condition.

The term bang-singular control refers to a control that has a bang-bang portion as well as a singular portion.

References

External links

Control theory
Optimal control